Race is a 2016 biographical sports drama film about African-American athlete Jesse Owens, who won a record-breaking four gold medals at the 1936 Berlin Olympic Games. Directed by Stephen Hopkins and written by Joe Shrapnel and Anna Waterhouse, the film stars Stephan James as Owens, and co-stars Jason Sudeikis, Jeremy Irons, William Hurt and Carice van Houten. It is a co-production of Canada, Germany and France.

Principal photography began on 24 July 2014, in Montreal, Canada. Forecast Pictures, Solofilms and Trinity Race produced the film, supported by the Owens family, the Jesse Owens Foundation, the Jesse Owens Trust and the Luminary Group. The film was a commercial success and received mixed to positive reviews, winning four Canadian Screen Awards, including Best Actor for James.

Plot
Jesse Owens, a promising Black American runner, attends Ohio State University, first in his family to attend college, despite facing racial discrimination and slurs from the white athletes. He attracts the attention of coach Larry Snyder, a former Olympic-level athlete who believes Owens has enormous potential but needs work on his form and technique. When Snyder suggests he is good enough to compete at the 1936 Berlin Olympic Games, Owens is interested, but hesitant because of racial propaganda in Nazi Germany. The U.S. Olympic Committee is already considering boycotting the Olympics over Germany's discriminatory policies, agreeing to participate only when Nazi official Joseph Goebbels gives personal assurances they will allow foreign athletes of any race to compete, as well as promising to rein in their propaganda.

As Owens struggles to support his girlfriend Ruth and young daughter, he takes a job at a service station, upsetting Snyder when his job conflicts with his commitment to train. When Snyder learns Owens has a family to support, he gets him a no-show job as a legislative page, allowing him to focus on running. Owens goes on to break several records, including some of Snyder's, and begins a relationship with a flashy woman whose attentions he attracts with his newfound fame. When Ruth threatens him with a lawsuit, Owens becomes distracted and loses a race to runner Eulace Peacock. Owens decides to return to Ruth to reconcile, convincing her to marry him. As the Olympics draw closer, the NAACP asks him not to go to Berlin for political reasons. Owens is conflicted, but Peacock, now injured, urges him to compete to defy Nazi racial ideology.

In Berlin, Owens wins his first gold medal in the 100 m dash, but when he is brought by International Olympic Committee member Avery Brundage to receive congratulations from Adolf Hitler, he is told the Chancellor has left the stadium early to avoid traffic. Brundage warns Goebbels that Hitler must congratulate all winners or none of them, to which Goebbels replies that Hitler will not appear with "that".

Owens next qualifies for the broad jump after German rival Luz Long unexpectedly gives him tips on his technique. Owens wins another medal, and Luz publicly shakes his hand and joins him for a victory lap, later privately expressing concern about national politics. Owens wins his fourth and final medal in the 4 x 100 m relay, filling in for two Jewish American athletes cut by Brundage, who is convinced by Goebbels to do so to avoid a scandal over a business arrangement Brundage entered with the Nazis before the games. Director Leni Riefenstahl films the event against Goebbels' orders, then asks Owens to repeat his medal-winning broad jump to get a few more shots for her next film, Olympia. Back in America, Owens and Snyder attend a banquet for Owens, but the doorman regretfully tells Owens he must enter through the service entrance. Owens does so over Snyder's protests, recognized by various awed observers, and the boy operating an elevator gets his autograph before taking him and Ruth up to the banquet.

Cast

Production

Development
John Boyega was initially set to star as Owens; however, he eventually dropped out to star in Star Wars: The Force Awakens. and was subsequently replaced by Stephan James. German and Canadian distribution was handled by Squareone Entertainment and Entertainment One with Focus Features handling the distribution in the United States.

Filming

Principal photography started on 24 July 2014, in Montreal, and on location at Olympic Stadium in Berlin.

Release
On October 1, 2014, Focus Features originally set a release date for April 8, 2016. However, in August 2015, the release date was pushed up to February 19, 2016.

On February 15, an advanced screening was shown at Mershon Auditorium at Ohio State University, Owens' alma mater. Jesse Owens' two daughters and Stephan James were in attendance and addressed the crowd. The President of Ohio State, Michael V. Drake, also addressed the crowd and spoke briefly about Owens' global impact and life at Ohio State. It was released by Entertainment One in Canada, Focus Features in the United States on 19 February 2016, Eagle Pictures in Italy on 31 March 2016, and SquareOne Entertainment in Germany on 5 May 2016.

Reception

Box office
Race grossed $19.2 million in North America and $5.9 million in other territories for a worldwide total of $25.1 million.

In the United States and Canada, pre-release tracking suggested the film would gross $4–7 million from 2,369 theaters in its opening weekend, trailing fellow newcomer Risen ($7–12 million projection) but similar to The Witch ($5–7 million projection). It ended up grossing $7.4 million in its opening weekend, finishing in sixth at the box office.

Critical response
On Rotten Tomatoes, as of November 2021, the film has an approval rating of 63% based on 162 reviews, and an average rating of 6.10/10. The website's critical consensus reads: "Race is nowhere near as thrillingly fleet or agile as its subject, but the story—and a winning central performance from Stephan James—are enough to carry it over the finish line." As of August 2020, Metacritic assigned the film a weighted average score of 56 out of 100, based on 35 critics, indicating "mixed or average reviews". Audiences polled by CinemaScore gave the film an average grade of "A" on an A+ to F scale.

Accolades
Race received eight nominations, including Best Motion Picture, at the 5th Canadian Screen Awards.

References

External links
 
 
 
 
 
 

2016 films
2016 biographical drama films
2010s sports drama films

Canadian biographical drama films
Canadian sports drama films
English-language Canadian films
English-language French films
English-language German films
French biographical drama films
French sports drama films
German biographical drama films
German sports drama films
2010s English-language films
Leni Riefenstahl
Biographical films about sportspeople
2010s chase films
Drama films based on actual events
Films about the 1936 Summer Olympics
Films about Olympic track and field
Films set in Berlin
Films set in Cleveland
Films set in 1933
Films set in 1934
Films set in 1935
Films set in 1936
Films shot in Berlin
Films about Nazi Germany
Films shot in Montreal
Sports films based on actual events
Running films
Entertainment One films
Focus Features films
Films directed by Stephen Hopkins
Films scored by Rachel Portman
African-American biographical dramas
Cultural depictions of Jesse Owens
Cultural depictions of Joseph Goebbels
Cultural depictions of Adolf Hitler
Cultural depictions of Leni Riefenstahl
2016 drama films
2010s American films
2010s Canadian films
2010s French films
2010s German films